John Morse  (born 1951) is a British political activist involved with the far-right. He was a leading figure in the British National Party under John Tyndall, serving alongside Richard Edmonds as Tyndall's closest ally in the party.

His alliance with Tyndall began when Morse supported his leadership of the National Front and continued when he was a founder of the New National Front. In the BNP, Morse served as editor of the party newspaper British Nationalist. Tyndall and Morse were imprisoned in 1986 for publishing material relating to racial hatred for a year, although the two men only served four months. In 1994 Morse and Edmonds were both charged with causing violent disorder after a black man was struck with a glass in Bethnal Green.

Based in Winchester, he served as the BNP's Mid-South organiser but resigned from the position in 1999 when Tyndall was replaced as party chairman by Nick Griffin.

Morse was expelled from the BNP in 2002 and, although he was later reinstated, he is no longer involved in the party.

Apart from his political activities, Morse worked as a bus driver.

Elections contested
UK General elections

European Parliament elections

References

1951 births
Living people
British National Party politicians
Bus drivers
English far-right politicians
National Front (UK) politicians
Politicians from Winchester